The Municipality of Cerknica is a municipality in the Karst region of southwestern Slovenia, with a population of 11,350 in 2012. The seat of the municipality is the town of Cerknica. It belongs to the traditional region of Inner Carniola.

The best-known landmark of the municipality is Lake Cerknica, an intermittent lake and the largest lake in Slovenia, south of the town of Cerknica. Various watersports including windsurfing are popular on the lake.

Settlements
In addition to the municipal seat of Cerknica, the municipality also includes the following settlements:

 Beč
 Bečaje
 Begunje pri Cerknici
 Bezuljak
 Bločice
 Bloška Polica
 Brezje
 Cajnarje
 Čohovo
 Dobec
 Dolenja Vas
 Dolenje Jezero
 Dolenje Otave
 Gora
 Gorenje Jezero
 Gorenje Otave
 Goričice
 Grahovo
 Hribljane
 Hruškarje
 Ivanje Selo
 Jeršiče
 Korošče
 Koščake
 Kožljek
 Kranjče
 Kremenca
 Krušče
 Kržišče
 Laze pri Gorenjem Jezeru
 Lešnjake
 Lipsenj
 Mahneti
 Martinjak
 Milava
 Osredek
 Otok
 Otonica
 Pikovnik
 Pirmane
 Podskrajnik
 Podslivnica
 Ponikve
 Rakek
 Rakov Škocjan
 Ravne
 Reparje
 Rudolfovo
 Selšček
 Slivice
 Slugovo
 Stražišče
 Ščurkovo
 Štrukljeva Vas
 Sveti Vid
 Tavžlje
 Topol pri Begunjah
 Unec
 Zahrib
 Zala
 Zelše
 Žerovnica
 Zibovnik
 Župeno

References

External links

Municipality of Cerknica on Geopedia
Official site of the municipality 

 
Cerknica
1994 establishments in Slovenia